Iván de Pineda (born 11 July 1977) is an Argentine-Spanish international fashion model, film actor and TV host. He has modelled in New York City, London and Milan. de Pineda was born in Madrid to a Spanish father and an Argentine mother. He and his mother moved to Argentina after his father's death when he was a child.

De Pineda began to model at age 17, and would later represent labels such as YSL, Chanel, Diesel, DKNY, Kenzo, Moschino, and Versace. He made his television debut in the 2000 series Calientes playing the character of Nacho, and in 2005 debuted on Argentine cinema; his 2007 film Cuando ella saltó garnered him a Best New Actor award at the 2008 Silver Condor awards.

Nowadays, he is in a TV programme called "Pasapalabra" in Argentina.

Filmography
 Calientes (2000) TV series as Nacho
 Un Buda (2005) as Carlos
 Cuando ella saltó (2007) as Ramiro
 Las hermanas L (2008) as novio francés
 Paco - pre-production (2009)
 Eva y Lola (2010) as Iván

References

External links
 
 

1977 births
Living people
People from Madrid
Spanish people of Argentine descent
Spanish emigrants to Argentina
Citizens of Argentina through descent
Argentine male film actors
Argentine male models
Argentine people of Spanish descent